Honne or Hönne may refer to:

 Honne and tatemae, Japanese words that describe the contrast between a person's true feelings and desires, and the behavior and opinions one displays in public
 Hönne, a river in Germany
 Honne (band), an English electronic music duo
 Honne (tree), a tree that grows in southern India
 Yasuyuki Honne (born 1971), Japanese video game designer